Barrière Saint-Genès tram stop is located on line  of the tramway de Bordeaux.

Location
The station is located at Barrière Saint-Genès, between Bordeaux (courtyard de l'Argonne) and Talence (courtyard Gambetta).

Junctions
 Buses of the TBC:

Close by
Ecole, collège, lycée Saint-Genès
Collège Alain Fournier
Ecole et collège Albert Legrand
Colloc' Saint-Genès

See also
 TBC
 Tramway de Bordeaux

External links
 

Bordeaux tramway stops
Tram stops in Bordeaux
Railway stations in France opened in 2004
Tram stops in Talence